Parliamentary elections were held in Czechoslovakia on 28 November 1954. Voters were presented with a single list from the National Front, dominated by the Communist Party of Czechoslovakia (KSČ). 

According to official figures, 99.2 percent of eligible voters turned out to vote, and 97.9 percent approved the National Front list. Within the Front, the Communists had a large majority of 262 seats–172 for the main party and 90 for the Slovak branch.

Non-Communist members appeared on the National Front list in order to keep up the appearance of pluralism. However, seats were allocated in accordance with a set percentage, and no party could take part in the political process without KSČ approval.

Results

References

Czechoslovakia
Parliamentary
Single-candidate elections
Elections in Communist Czechoslovakia
Czechoslovakia